Tuur may refer to:

Abdirahman Ahmed Ali Tuur (1931-2003), Somalian politician
Regilio Tuur (1967), Dutch boxer
Regillio Tuur (1986), Belgian-born Surinamese footballer
Erkki-Sven Tüür (1959), Estonian composer
Mihkel Tüür (1976), Estonian architect